Smerch is a Nanuchka III-class corvette of the Russian Navy. It is classified as a Small Missile Ship/FFL (Малый Ракетный Корабль/МРК) and is currently registered with hull number 423.

She is currently assigned to the Russian Pacific Ocean Fleet and was built in 1984.

On 1 February 2014 it was reported that while under the command of Captain 3rd Rank Alexei Petrov (Алексей Петров), she conducted training in local waters near the Kamchatka Peninsula. Training events included protecting the vessel, chemical contamination of the water supply, using personal protective equipment, disinfection, and decontamination of the ship.

On 25 March 2013 it was reported that she participated in local training with her Nanuchka III-class sister ship Iney (Иней, 'Frost') and Grisha V-class MPK-82 (МПК-82) in Avacha Bay. Her crew trained on survival in severe weather conditions and responding to emergencies. Future training was to consist of anti-aircraft and anti-submarine warfare. One of the corvettes was pictured launching an SA-N-4 missile and shooting its AK-176 gun.

Following an extensive refit from 2017-2019, Smerch was re-entered service with a new AK-176MA 76-mm gun and 4x4 Uran/SS-N-25 'Switchblade' replacing the old triple SS-N-9 launchers.

References

1984 ships
Ships of the Russian Navy
Ships built in the Soviet Union